Blastobasis anachasta is a moth in the  family Blastobasidae. It was described by Edward Meyrick in 1931. It is found in Brazil.

References

Natural History Museum Lepidoptera generic names catalog

Blastobasis
Moths described in 1931
Moths of South America
Taxa named by Edward Meyrick